National Highway 153 (NH 153), formerly NH-216, is a  national highway in India. It is a spur road of National Highway 53.  NH-153 traverses the state of Chhattisgarh in India.

Route 
NH-53 at Saraipali, Sarangarh, NH-49 at Raigarh.

Junctions  
 
  Terminal near Saraipali.
  Terminal near Raigarh.

See also 
 List of National Highways in India
 List of National Highways in India by state

References

External links 

 NH 153 on OpenStreetMap

National highways in India
National Highways in Chhattisgarh